General elections were held in Fiji in June and July 1917.

Electoral system
Changes were made to the constitution on 20 July 1916, increasing the number of nominated members in the Legislative Council from 10 to 12; eleven were civil servants and the other had to be a British subject not holding public office. The number of elected Europeans remained at seven and the number of appointed Fijians at two. The Governor served as President of the Council.

The Europeans were elected from six constituencies; Eastern, Northern, Southern, Suva, Vanua Levu & Taveuni and Western. Voting was restricted to men aged 21 or over who had been born to European parents (or a European father and was able to read, speak and write English) who were British subjects and had been continuously resident in Fiji for 12 months, either owning at least £20 of freehold or leasehold property or having an annual income of at least £120, and were not on the public payroll.

Results

Appointed members
The nominated members were appointed on 3 August.

Aftermath
The results of the Vanua Levu and Taveuni seat were later annulled by the Supreme Court. As a result, a by-election was held in November 1917 which Joseph MacKay was again elected, receiving 84 votes to the 50  of J. Harper received 50 votes and three for James McConnell. However, MacKay died on 6 December. John Francis Dyer was subsequently elected in the constituency in another by-election in 1919.

References

1917 elections in Oceania
1917 in Fiji
1917
1917 elections in the British Empire